Abutilon palmeri, known as Palmer's abutilon, superstition mallow, and Palmer's Indian mallow is a species of flowering plant native the Southwestern United States and northwestern Mexico.

The plant is found in the Sonoran Desert in Arizona, and in Southern California in the Sonoran Colorado Desert and adjacent eastern foothill ecotones of the Peninsular Ranges.

Description 
The branch and stem coloration is green to reddish brown and pubescent.

The alternate leaves are velvety and heart-shaped (nearly round to cordate). The leaves are serrate and densely woolly, giving a bluish, grey-green cast to the foliage.

It blooms for most of the year.

The fruit is multi-parted and covered with silky pubescence similar to the foliage.

Cultivation 
Abutilon palmeri is cultivated as an ornamental plant by specialty nurseries for planting in native plant, xeriscape, wildlife gardens, and in natural landscaping projects in warm climates.

References

External links

Jepson Manual treatment for Abutilon palmeri
CalFlora Database: Abutilon palmeri (Palmer's abutilon, Palmer's Indian mallow)
Abutilon palmeri — UC Photos gallery

palmeri
Flora of Arizona
Flora of California
Flora of Northwestern Mexico
Flora of the California desert regions
Flora of the Sonoran Deserts
Garden plants of North America
Drought-tolerant plants
Shrubs
Flora without expected TNC conservation status